K. Manju is an Indian film producer and distributor, known for his films produced in Kannada cinema. He made several films through his two production companies, K Manju Cinemaas and Lakshmishree Combines. A large number of his films have been commercially successful, some of them are among the top-ten highest grossing Kannada films of all time.

In 2014, Manju was reported to apply for the Limca Book of Records for producing a record five films at one given time. This included four Kannada films and one Tamil film.

Filmography 

As Presenter

References

External links 
 
 
 
 K Manju is fondly addressed as Kobri Manja

Living people
Indian film producers
Kannada film producers
People from Tumkur
Film producers from Karnataka
Tamil film producers
Male actors in Kannada cinema
Indian male film actors
21st-century Indian male actors
Male actors from Karnataka
Year of birth missing (living people)